The Sound of Trees is a 2015 Canadian film directed by François Péloquin. The film stars Antoine L'Écuyer as Jérémie, a teenager who dreams of escaping his small-town life in the Gaspésie region of Quebec, posing problems in his relationship with his father Régis (Roy Dupuis).

The film's cast also includes Rémi Goulet, Yvon Barrette and Marylène Thériault.

The film premiered in Quebec theatres on July 3, 2015, and was screened in competition at the Karlovy Vary International Film Festival. At the 2015 Vancouver International Film Festival, Péloquin won the award for Emerging Canadian Director.

References

External links
 

2015 films
2015 drama films
2010s coming-of-age drama films
Quebec films
Canadian coming-of-age drama films
Films shot in Quebec
Films set in Quebec
French-language Canadian films
2010s Canadian films
2010s French-language films